Maliponia is a Gram-negative bacterial genus from the family of Rhodobacteraceae with one known species (Maliponia aquimaris). Maliponia aquimaris has been isolated from seawater.

References

Rhodobacteraceae
Monotypic bacteria genera
Bacteria genera